This is a list of episodes for The Daily Show in 1998. It covers shows hosted by Craig Kilborn.

1998

January

February

March

April

May

June

July

August

September

October

November

December

References

 
1998 American television seasons